The sailing competition at the 2010 Central American and Caribbean Games was held in Mayagüez, Puerto Rico.

The tournament was scheduled to be held from 24–30 July at the Balneario de Boqueron in Porta del Sol.

Medal summary

Men's events

Women's events

Team events

External links

Events at the 2010 Central American and Caribbean Games
July 2010 sports events in North America
2010 in sailing
2010
Sailing competitions in Puerto Rico